Juan Domínguez may refer to:

Sportsmen
Juan Carlos Domínguez (born 1971), Spanish road racing cyclist
Juan Domínguez (baseball) (born 1980), Dominican baseball player
Juan Domínguez (footballer, born 1983), Spanish footballer
Juan Domínguez (Colombian footballer) (born 1986), Colombian footballer
Juan Domínguez (footballer, born 1990), Spanish footballer
Juan Carlos Domínguez (footballer) (born 1943), Argentine footballer
Juan Domínguez (boxer) (born 1986), Dominican boxer

Others
Juan Domínguez de Medina (died 1246), Castilian prelate
Juan Dominguez (lawyer) (born 1957), American lawyer
Juan Domínguez (politician), Uruguayan politician